Music is often played at wedding celebrations, including during the ceremony and at festivities before or after the event. The music can be performed live by instrumentalists or vocalists or may use pre-recorded songs, depending on the format of the event, traditions associated with the prevailing culture and the wishes of the couple being married.

Entry and ceremony
There are many different styles of music that can be played during the entrance and ceremony. During the service there may be a few hymns, especially in liturgical settings. While some elements of the ceremony may be personalized for a specific couple, the order of service will most of the time follow a similar pattern.

A prelude often precedes the wedding. During the prelude, guests arrive to the gathering place while ambiance music is being played. Calm and light music is usually performed at that time, setting the mood for the ceremony while not being too distracting for the guests. Popular prelude music includes Air on the G string and Jesu, Joy of Man's Desiring by Johann Sebastian Bach.

 
Music can be used to announce the arrival of the participants of the wedding (such as a bride's processional), and in many western cultures, this takes the form of a wedding march. For more than a century, the Bridal Chorus from Wagner's Lohengrin (1850), often called "Here Comes The Bride", has been the most popular processional, and is traditionally played on a pipe organ.

Some couples may consider traditional wedding marches clichéd and choose a more modern piece of music or an alternative such as Canon in D by Johann Pachelbel.  Since the televised wedding of Charles, Prince of Wales and Lady Diana Spencer in 1981, there has been an upsurge in popularity of Jeremiah Clarke's "Prince of Denmark's March" for use as processional music; the piece was formerly (and incorrectly) attributed to Henry Purcell as Trumpet Voluntary.

At the end of the service, in Western traditions, the bride and groom march back up the aisle to a lively recessional tune, a popular one being Mendelssohn's Wedding March from A Midsummer Night's Dream (1842). The piece achieved popularity after it was played during the wedding of Victoria, Princess Royal to Prince Frederick William of Prussia in 1858. Another popular choice is Widor's Toccata from Symphony for Organ No. 5 (1880).

Weddings in other cultures have different formats. In Egypt, there is a specific rhythm called the zaffa. Traditionally, a belly dancer will lead the bride to the wedding hall, accompanied by musicians playing the elzaff, on drums and trumpets, sometimes the flaming torches. This is of unknown antiquity, and may even be from the pre-Islamic era.

At Jewish weddings, the entrance of the groom is accompanied by the tune Baruch Haba. Meanwhile Siman Tov ("Good Tidings") is an all-purpose celebratory song.

In traditional Burmese weddings, a classical song like "Aura of Immeasurable Auspiciousness" (အတိုင်းမသိမင်္ဂလာသြဘာဘွဲ့, Ataing Mathi Mingala Awba Bwe) from the Mahāgīta corpus, is played as a processional music.

Interfaith marriage ceremonies have benefited by the efforts of several modern composers, many of whom have written processional marches to honor the religious traditions of both the bride and the groom.  Included in this group are John Serry Sr. (1968).

Post ceremony

After the ceremony, there is often a celebratory dance, or reception, where there may be musical entertainment such as a wedding singer, live wedding band, or DJ to play songs for the couple and guests. (The exiting of the bridal party is also called the wedding recessional.)

There are several things to consider before choosing wedding music. For starters, you want to ensure that the song fits the mood of the event. If you’re having a formal affair, then you might want something classic. On the other hand, if you’re looking for a fun vibe, then you might want to go with a danceable tune. Also, you should consider the age group of your guests. If they’re older, then you might want a slower song. Younger couples may prefer upbeat tunes. Finally, you also need to take into account the type of venue where you’re holding the wedding. Some venues don’t allow certain types of music.

See also
Processional
Recessional

References

 
Music genres